Niek Hoogveld (born 24 March 1999) is a Dutch professional footballer who plays as a centre back for USV Hercules.

Club career
Hoogveld started playing football at RKSV Driel, and since 2008 in the youth of NEC. On 15 March 2019 he made his debut for NEC against FC Den Bosch.

References

External links
 

1999 births
Footballers from Nijmegen
Living people
Association football forwards
Dutch footballers
Netherlands youth international footballers
NEC Nijmegen players
USV Hercules players
Eerste Divisie players
Derde Divisie players